The Cripple in Black is an Australian novel by E. V. Timms set in seventeenth century Italy and England.

Kindly Genoese merchant Balsamo becomes the vengeful "cripple in black" when a girl under his protection is abducted by an arrogant English aristocrat.

The Sydney Morning Herald said that "Here and there one might wish for a little more skilful handling, but any shortcomings are amply compensated for by the work at the end It Is an eminently readable story, with excellent characterisation."

The novel was adapted for the radio in 1939.

References

External links
Complete copy of novel printed in 1938 Australian Woman's Weekly
The Cripple in Black radio play at AustLit

1930 Australian novels
Australian historical novels
Novels set in Liguria
Novels set in England
Novels set in the 17th century
Novels adapted into radio programs